The Hong Fa Temple is a temple in Xinxing, Kaohsiung, Taiwan.

Transportation
The temple is accessible within walking distance North West from Sinyi Elementary School Station of Kaohsiung MRT.

See also
 Buddhism in Taiwan
 List of temples in Taiwan
 List of tourist attractions in Taiwan

References

1964 establishments in Taiwan
Religious buildings and structures completed in 1964
Temples in Kaohsiung
Buddhist temples in Taiwan